Beijing Enlight Media Co., Ltd. known as Enlight Media is a Chinese publicly traded company. It is a TV program production enterprise, as well as film production via Beijing Enlight Pictures. The company was incorporated on 24 April 2000.

Beijing Enlight Media was a constituent of Shenzhen Stock Exchange blue-chip index SZSE 100 Index, but removed on 12 June 2017 (effective on the first trading day of July). , Beijing Enlight Media is a constituent of SZSE 200 Index (mid cap index).

Artist 
Liu Yan

Shareholders
As at 31 December 2015, Wang Changtian, chairman of Enlight Media, via Shanghai Enlight Investment Holding, owned 50.06% shares of Enlight Media as the largest shareholder; the second largest shareholder of Enlight Media was Ali Venture Capital, The third largest shareholder (for 3.87%), Du Yinglian, was in fact Wang's wife. The sixth (1.37%) and seventh (1.15%) largest shareholder, were younger brother and sister of Wang Changtian. Deputy general managers (and directors), Li Xiaoping and Li Delai owned 3.79% and 3.23% shares respectively as the fourth and fifth largest shareholder.

Other shareholders in the top 10 were National Social Security Fund (0.28%), an index-tracking fund of China Construction Bank (0.21%) and Everbright Securities (0.21%).

Footnotes

References

External links
  
 Beijing Enlight Media Artist

Former companies in the SZSE 100 Index
Mass media companies of China
Chinese companies established in 2000
Companies based in Beijing
Mass media in Beijing
Companies listed on the Shenzhen Stock Exchange
Civilian-run enterprises of China